Blue Groove is an album by saxophonist Gene Ammons recorded in 1961 but not released on the Prestige label until 1982.

Reception
Allmusic awarded the album 2 stars with its review by Scott Yanow stating, "This particular LP, released for the first time in 1982, is an average, although enjoyable enough, outing... Nothing that unusual occurs but fans should enjoy this set".

Track listing 
All compositions by Gene Ammons except where noted.
 "Blue Groove" – 4:19   
 "You Better Go Now" (Irvin Graham, Bickley Reichner) – 3:15   
 "It Never Goes Away" (Clarence Anderson) – 7:50   
 "Blinky" – 3:29   
 "Yea! "- 3:09   
 "Someone to Watch Over Me" (George Gershwin, Ira Gershwin) – 5:30   
 "Sleepy" (Anderson) – 4:44   
 "The Masquerade Is Over" (Herb Magidson, Allie Wrubel) –  4:43

Personnel 
Gene Ammons – tenor saxophone
Clarence "Sleepy" Anderson – organ, piano 
Unnamed musicians – guitar, bass, drums, vocals

References 

Gene Ammons albums
1982 albums
Prestige Records albums